Cucurbitacin D is a plant steroid with anticancer activity.

External links
 Cucurbitacin D induces growth inhibition, cell cycle arrest, and apoptosis in human endometrial and ovarian cancer cells

Steroids